Abu Saleh Najmuddin was a former legislator of Assam. He won assembly elections in 1991 and 1996 from Badarpur constituency. He was a Minister in Government of Assam under the chief ministership of late Hiteswar Saikia. Abu Saleh was an advocate by profession.

Political career 
Abu Saleh fought the 1996 Assembly Constituency Election as the Congress candidate and was elected as the MLA from Badarpur Constituency with a total vote of 30138 against Dipak Deb of BJP who gained 2nd position with 16434 votes.

In 1996, he stood against CPM candidate Ramendra De whom he defeated with a huge margin of 35,256.

References

Assam politicians
Political office-holders in Assam
Members of the Assam Legislative Assembly